The 1997 Intercontinental Cup was an association football match played on 2 December 1997 between Borussia Dortmund, winners of the 1996–97 UEFA Champions League, and Cruzeiro, winners of the 1997 Copa Libertadores. The match was played at the neutral venue of the National Stadium in Tokyo in front of 46,953 fans. Andreas Möller was named as man of the match.

Teams

Venue

Match details

Match Ball
The Ball of the match was the Adidas Questra, originally designed to be the official match ball of the 1994 FIFA World Cup in the United States.

See also
1996–97 UEFA Champions League
1997 Copa Libertadores
Borussia Dortmund in European football

References

External links
1997 Intercontinental Cup at FIFA.com

 

1997–98 in European football
1997 in South American football
1997 in Japanese football
1997
Borussia Dortmund matches
Cruzeiro Esporte Clube matches
1997
1997 in Brazilian football
1997–98 in German football
Sports competitions in Tokyo
1997 in Tokyo
December 1997 sports events in Asia
1997 in association football